The Weiwang M20, M30, and M35 are mini MPVs produced by Weiwang, a sub-brand of BAIC.

Weiwang M20

The Beijing Auto Weiwang M20 debuted during the 2013 Guangzhou Auto Show with the first examples of the mini-MPV available with a pre-sale price of 62,800 yuan. 

The production model was officially available to the market in October 2013 with prices starting from 46,800 yuan to 63,800 yuan. The engine of the Weiwang M20 is a 1.5 liter four-cylinder engine producing 106hp and 145nm, mated to a 5-speed manual transmission. Weiwang is a brand under the Beiqi Yinxiang Automobile, a joint venture between Beijing Auto (Beiqi) and the Yinxiang Motorcycle Group from Chongqing. This joint venture also sells the Huansu brand and the Weiwang M20 is based on the same platform as the Huansu H2.

The Weiwang M20 can be configured as an 8-seater model. The interior is equipped with standard feature such as remote key, power windows, air conditioner, CD player, rear parking radar, and front fog lamps come standard on all trim levels except for the entry trim level. The M20 was the 8th best-selling MPV in China in 2014 with 77,497 deliveries.

Weiwang M30 
The Weiwang M30 is the more premium facelift variant of the regular Weiwang M20 featuring a redesigned front bumper with restyled grilles and front and rear lamps. The Weiwang M30 was introduced at the end of 2015 as a replacement to the Weiwang M20 that it was based on.

Weiwang M35

The Weiwang M35 is the crossover variant of the regular Weiwang M20 featuring a redesigned front bumper with restyled grilles and front and rear lamps that also varies from the Weiwang M30. The Weiwang M35 also features plastic claddings on the side skirts and a slightly higher ground clearance for the crossover-inspired styling.

Changhe Freedom M50
The Changhe Freedom M50 or Changhe Furuida M50 is a badge engineered variant of the Weiwang M20 featuring a redesigned front end. It was sold as part of the Freedom MPV series under the Changhe sub-brand of BAIC Group.

Later models share the exact same front bumpers as the Weiwang M20 variants with only the badges and the front grilles replaced.

Changhe Freedom M50S

A sportier version called the Changhe Freedom M50S was also available featuring a redesigned front bumper and rocker panels.

References

External links

Mini MPVs
Microvans
BAIC Group vehicles
Cars introduced in 2013
Cars of China